SH3 domain-binding protein 5 is a protein that in humans is encoded by the SH3BP5 gene.

Interactions
SH3BP5 has been shown to interact with Bruton's tyrosine kinase and MAPK8.

References

Further reading